Pitchup.com is a London-, UK, based online campsite and holiday park booking website started in 2009. The website has been shortlisted in the Independent Travel Awards 2015 for "Best Place to Stay - Budget".

In addition to English, the website is localized to 10 other languages including French, Spanish, Italian, German, Dutch, Swedish, Norwegian, Danish, Brazilian Portuguese, and Czech.

External links 

British travel websites